Lōya Paktiā (lit. Greater Paktia) is a historical and cultural region of Afghanistan, comprising the modern Afghan provinces of Khost, Paktia, and Paktika, as well as parts of Logar and parts of Kurram and Waziristan of Khyber Pakhtunkhwa. Loya Paktia is vaguely defined by a common culture and history that is connected to the local indigenous tribes that reside in the region. Particular styles of clothing, articles of clothing, turban styles, turban cloth colors, dialects of Pashto language, etc. may sometimes be associated with specific tribes indigenous to Loya Paktia and thus integrate themselves into regional culture. For instance, a Pashtun tribesman from Loy Kandahar may quickly recognize a Pashtun from Loya Paktia based upon his turban (or lungee) style and color. Likewise, a Pashtun from Loya Paktia may recognize someone from Loy Kandahar based upon his unique style of collarless kameez (shirt) with specific embroidered patterns on the front. There are many subtle and intricate cultural indicators of this type that are not recorded in any known written history but simply known and observed by the tribesmen of the various Pashtun regions of Afghanistan and Pakistan.

Main settlements
The largest city of the region is Khost, while other cities of Loya Paktia include Gardez (capital of Paktia Province), Zurmat (largest city of Paktia Province), Urgun (largest city of Paktika), and Sharana (capital of Paktika).

Other main towns of Loya Paktia are Sardeh Band (Ghazni), Charkh (Logar), Tari Mangal (Kurram), Angur Ada (partly in South Waziristan), Yakubi, Tani, Dadwal, Aryob, Khandkhel, Tsamkani, Zarghun Shar, Wazakhwa, and Zerok.

Demography
The population mostly consists of Pashtuns from various tribes under the larger Karlani and Ghilji confederacies. Predominant tribes with notable large populations native to Loya Paktia include Zadran, Zazi, Mangal, Ahmadzai, Totakhil, Tani, Sabari, Sulaimankhel, Kharoti, Wazir, and Gurbaz. Kochian are common in the region throughout the year who still live a nomadic lifestyle.

References

Regions of Afghanistan
Pashtun culture
Paktia Province
Paktika Province
Khost Province
Historical regions